Barberton may refer to:

 Barberton, Mpumalanga, South Africa
 Barberton, Ohio, United States
 Barberton, Washington, United States
 Barberton, Western Australia
 Barberton Greenstone Belt